The 1934 Providence Friars football team was an American football team that represented Providence College during the 1934 college football season. Led by first-year head coach Joe McGee, the team compiled a 4–3 record and was outscored by a total of 100 to 66.

Schedule

References

Providence
Providence Friars football seasons
Providence Friars football